Will Gay Bottje (June 30, 1925; Grand Rapids, Michigan - January 7, 2018; Grand Rapids, Michigan) was an American composer known for his contributions to electronic music.

Bottje was a graduate of the Juilliard School (Bachelor of Music in flute performance and Master of Music in composition) where he studied composition with Vittorio Giannini. He went on to pursue studies at the Eastman School of Music where he was a pupil of Bernard Rogers and Howard Hanson. From Eastman he earned a Doctor of Musical Arts in Composition, the second such degree to be awarded to a student from any institution. He also studied composition privately with Nadia Boulanger in Paris, and was a pupil of Henk Badings at the University of Utrecht's electronic music studio.

From 1957–1981 Bottje taught on the music faculty at Southern Illinois University in Carbondale, Illinois. There he founded and directed SIU's electronic music studio. One of his notable pupils at SIU was composer Larry Lake.

Selected compositions

Orchestral
 Commentaries for Guitar & Small Orchestra (also piano reduction)
 Concertino for Piccolo & Orchestra (piano reduction Zalo)
 Concerto for 2 Flutes & Orchestra (Piano vers. J/P publication)
 Concerto for Horn & Orchestra (also piano reduction)
 Concerto for Oboe, Violin & Orchestra (small)
 Flavors (Community or select high school)
 Full Circle
 Opener
 Sinfonia for Young String Orchestra
 Sounds From the West Shore
 The Ballad Singer

Vocal and choral
 A Sentence Once Begun – Soprano, Str Quartet (Ch. Fry) (piano reduction)
 Cantata for the 53rd Sunday ( A Prayer for Middle Age) – SATB, 3 solos, keyboard, soprano obligato instrument
 Carol (from Wind In the Willows) – SATB
 Credo (R. Roland) – SSAATTBB
 Diptych (Rilke) – SSAATTBB, part 2 with keyboard
 Exhortation of the Dawn – SATB and Brass Ensemble or keyboard
 In Caverns All Alone (7 songs on mind) – Soprano or Tenor, flute, bassoon and piano
 In Praise of Music (5 songs) (Elizabethan texts) – Mezzo-Soprano and String Quartet (Rev. 1997–98)
 Last Minute Message for a Time Capsule – SATB, ten dr
 Quests of Odysseus (Kazantzakis) – tenor and piano (8 songs)
 Radiant Musings (N. Cousins) – SATB and keyboard, 11 short settings which can be done as a whole, in part, or individually
 Thrush Song – SSAATTBB, solos & flute
 Wayward Pilgrim (5 songs) (E. Dickinson) – Soprano or Mezzo-soprano & Piano

Chamber music
 Brief Acquaintances – Oboe, Clarinet, Cello
 Brief Candles – Flute and Guitar
 Chorale and Allegro – four trumpets
 Concerto for Tuba – Tuba & Piano (also in ms. orch version)
 Country Wife-Suite (5 dances for Wycherly play) – flute, oboe, clarinet and bassoon.
 Dances: Real & Imagined – Guitar & String Quartet
 Designs- 2 flutes, cello, piano
 Diversions (Settings of Jim Thurber texts) – narrator, flute, oboe, bassoon, clarinet, horn and piano
 Dune Music – flute, oboe, cello and piano
 Duo Sonatina – 2 Euphoniums, piano (a vers. with 14 piece ensemble, also)
 Fireflies – Oboe, Harpsichord & String Quartet
 Incidental Music for a Restoration Comedy – clarinet, viola and cello
 Lighter Strings – Guitar & Harpsichord
 Litanies, Refrains & Alleluias – Trombone and piano
 Little Sonata No.1 – Flute and organ
 Little Sonata 5 – Clarinet and organ
 Little Sonata No.7 – Trumpet and organ
 Lyric Sonata (rev. 1998) – Bassoon and piano
 Music for a Joyous Occasion III – 2 flutes (or violins), and cello
 Prelude & Fugue – Tuba and piano
 Quintet for Flute & Strings
 Quintet for Clarinet, bassoon, french horn, violin, and contrabass
 Quintet Nr. 2 For Winds – flute, oboe, clarinet, bassoon and French horn
 Ready, Set-- 3 cellos, or 3 bassoons, or 3 Clarinets
 Recitative, Arioso & Finale – Trombone and piano
 Serenade – Wind quintet and string quartet
 Sextet for Strings – 2 violins, 2 violas and 2 cellos
 Sonata for 2 Cellos
 Sonatas 1,2, and 3 – cello and piano
 Sonata for Flute & Piano
 Sonata for Guitar
 Sonata for Trumpet & Piano
 Sonata for Violin & Piano
 Song and Dance (1998) – Violin and Piano
 Soundings – Oboe and Harpsichord
 Sprites & Phantoms – flute, oboe, clarinet, cello and piano
 String Quartets Nrs. 2, 4 & 5
 Symphony for Cello and Piano four-hands (rev. 1998)
 Three Flared Bells – trumpet, French horn and trombone
 Three Miniatures – flute and piano
 Tides – two pianos
 Trio – flute, cello and piano
 Trio (rev. 1998) – violin, cello and piano
 Triple Play- Clarinet & Piano
 Variations & Fugue – 4 trombones (400)
 Well-Tempered Flutes – 43 Preludes & Fugues from Bach WTC, arr for 2 flutes
 Wonders of the Night Sky – 8 piano ensemble

References

External links
 Will Gay Bottje at the American Composers Alliance

1925 births
2018 deaths
American electronic musicians
American male classical composers
American classical composers
Eastman School of Music alumni
Juilliard School alumni
Musicians from Grand Rapids, Michigan
Southern Illinois University faculty
Classical musicians from Michigan